Herpetogramma cora is a moth in the family Crambidae. It was described by Harrison Gray Dyar Jr. in 1914. It is found in Mexico (Orizaba) and Cuba.

References

Moths described in 1914
Herpetogramma
Moths of Central America
Moths of the Caribbean